Les Uns et les Autres is a 1981 French film by Claude Lelouch. The film is a musical epic and it is widely considered as the director's best work, along with Un Homme et une Femme. It won the Technical Grand Prize at the 1984 Cannes Film Festival. In the United States, it was distributed under the name Boléro in reference to Maurice Ravel's orchestral piece, used in the film. The film was very successful in France with 3,234,549 admissions and was the 6th highest-grossing film of the year.

Plot
The film follows four families, with different nationalities (French, German, Russian, and American) but with the same passion for music, from the 1930s to the 1980s. The various story lines cross each other time and again in different places and times, with their own theme scores that evolve as time passes.

In Moscow, 1936, an aspiring dancer Tatiana marries a man, Boris, who will give her a son just before he is killed during World War II. In Berlin, Karl Kremer's success as a pianist is confirmed when he receives praise from Hitler – something which will haunt him throughout his life. In Paris, a young violinist Anne falls in love with a Jewish pianist, Simon Meyer; they marry and produce a son, but they end up on a train bound for a Nazi concentration camp. In New York, Jack Glenn is making his name with his popular jazz band. Twenty years on, their children are reliving their experiences, and Anne Meyer continues her hopeless quest to find the son she was forced to abandon.

The main event in the film is the Second World War, which throws the stories of the four musical families together and mixes their fates. Although all characters are fictional, many of them are loosely based on historical musical icons (Édith Piaf, Josephine Baker, Herbert von Karajan, Glenn Miller, Rudolf Nureyev, etc.) The Boléro dance sequence at the end brings all the threads together.

Cast

 Robert Hossein as Simon Meyer / Robert Prat
 Nicole Garcia as Anne Meyer
 Geraldine Chaplin as Suzanne Glenn / Sarah Glenn
 James Caan as Jack Glenn / Jason Glenn
 Daniel Olbrychski as Karl Kremer
 Jean-Claude Bouttier as Philippe Rouget
 Jorge Donn as Boris Itovitch / Sergei Itovitch
 Rita Poelvoorde as Tatiana Itovitch / Nadia Itovitch
 Macha Méril as Magda Kremer
 Évelyne Bouix as Évelyne / Édith
 Francis Huster as Francis
 Raymond Pellegrin as M. Raymond
 Marthe Villalonga as Édith's grandmother
 Paul Préboist as Édith's grandfather
 Jean-Claude Brialy as Lido's director
 Fanny Ardant as Véronique
 Jacques Villeret as Jacques
 Richard Bohringer as Richard
 Nicole Croisille as herself
 Ginette Garcin as Ginette
 Jean-Pierre Kalfon as Father Antoine
 Geneviève Mnich as Jeanne, Jacques' mother
 Éva Darlan as Eva
 Ernie Garrett as Bobby
 Féodor Atkine as Alexis
 Jean-Claude Bouttier
 Jean-Pierre Castaldi
 Michèle Moretti
 Alexandra Stewart
 Francis Lai
 Barry Primus
 Valérie Quennessen as Francis Huster's girlfriend
 Brigitte Roüan (only in director's cut)
 Sharon Stone as girl in bed with Glenn senior
 Michel Rivard (only in director's cut)

Release
A heavily cut version was released in the United States with the title Bolero: Dance of Life.

References

External links

1984 films
Films about Jews and Judaism
Films directed by Claude Lelouch
French musical drama films
1980s French-language films
Holocaust films
Films scored by Michel Legrand
Films set in France
Films set in Germany
Films set in Russia
Films set in the United States
Films scored by Francis Lai
1980s French films